Stephen Gordon Catto, 2nd Baron Catto (14 January 1923 – 3 September 2001), was a British banker and businessman.

Educated at Eton College and Cambridge University, Catto in 1948 joined merchant bank Morgan Grenfell & Co. (where his father had previously been a partner) after four years service in the Royal Air Force Voluntary Reserve. He was appointed a director in 1957 and chairman of the bank in 1974. He became chairman of the group holding company, Morgan Grenfell Holdings, in 1979. Other directorships held included Yule Catto & Co plc (from 1960, Chairman from 1971 until 23 May 2000) and Times Newspapers Holdings Ltd.

Arms

Notes
Citations

References

Further reading
Richard Roberts, ‘Catto, Stephen Gordon, second Baron Catto (1923–2001)’, Oxford Dictionary of National Biography, online edn, Oxford University Press, Jan 2005

External links
Yule Catto & Co plc

1923 births
2001 deaths
People educated at Eton College
Alumni of the University of Cambridge
English chief executives
20th-century Scottish businesspeople
2
Stephen
20th-century English businesspeople
Catto